Union Church (also known as Yellow Pine Church or Yellow Pine Christian Church) is a historic one-room church south of Sibley in Webster Parish in northwestern Louisiana.

It was built in a Gothic Revival style and in 1996 was added to the National Register of Historic Places.

In 2013, the congregation initiated the construction of a second building for Sunday school rooms and a fellowship hall.

References

Churches on the National Register of Historic Places in Louisiana
Carpenter Gothic church buildings in Louisiana
Buildings and structures in Webster Parish, Louisiana
National Register of Historic Places in Webster Parish, Louisiana